Marlies Oester (born 22 August 1976 in Adelboden) is a Swiss former alpine skier who competed in the 2002 Winter Olympics.

External links
 sports-reference.com
 

1976 births
Living people
Swiss female alpine skiers
Olympic alpine skiers of Switzerland
Alpine skiers at the 2002 Winter Olympics
Sportspeople from the canton of Bern